Defending champion Margaret Court defeated Helga Niessen in the final, 6–2, 6–4 to win the women's singles tennis title at the 1970 French Open. It was her fifth French Open singles title, her third consecutive major title, and her eighteenth singles major overall. Court would go on to win the remaining two majors of the year to become the first woman in the Open Era to achieve the Grand Slam.

Seeds

Qualifying

Draw

Finals

Top half

Section 1

Section 2

Bottom half

Section 3

Section 4

References

External links
1970 French Open – Women's draws and results at the International Tennis Federation

Women's Singles
French Open by year – Women's singles
1970 in women's tennis
1970 in French women's sport